The Call is a 1902 painting by Paul Gauguin, produced in Polynesia a year before the artist's death. It is now in the Cleveland Museum of Art.

References

Paintings in the collection of the Cleveland Museum of Art
Paintings by Paul Gauguin
1902 paintings